Saint Martin of Tongres (died ca. 350) is venerated as the seventh bishop of Tongeren.  He apostolized the Hesbaye district of Brabant.

External links
 Saints of June 21: Martin of Tongres

Belgian Roman Catholic saints
350 deaths
4th-century Christian saints
Year of birth unknown